The final of the 2002 ICC Champions Trophy was rained-out twice, on 29 and 30 September 2002 at the R. Premadasa Stadium, Colombo. The final was scheduled to play between Sri Lanka cricket team and the India cricket team on 29 September 2002. Sri Lanka batted first and scored 244 runs for five wickets in 50 overs. Indian had played only two overs before the match was stopped by the rain.

On 30 September, the Sri Lankan again batted first and scored 222 runs for seven wickets. The match was abandoned as India reached 38 runs in 8.4 overs. Man of the Match and Man of the Series were not awarded, and both the team were declared as joint winners.

Background

First Semi-final
The first semi-final was played between India and South Africa on 25 September 2002. After winning the toss, India decided to bat first and score 261 runs for nine wickets in 50 overs. Sehwag scored 59 runs from 58 balls, including 10 fours; Yuvraj Singh and Rahul Dravid scored 62 and 49 runs respectively. Shaun Pollock took three wickets for 43 runs in nine overs. Chasing the target of 262, South Africa collapsed after reaching 192 runs for one wicket with Herschelle Gibbs scoring 116 and Jacques Kallis 97 runs in 37 overs. Gibbs could not continue his inning due to heat exhaustion. Sehwag got three wickets for 25 runs in five overs. India won the match by 10 runs and qualified for the final of the tournament.

Second Semi-final
The second semi-final was played between Sri Lanka and Australia on 27 September 2002. Australia won the toss, decided to bat first and score 162 runs in 48.4 overs. Shane Warne scored 36 runs followed by Adam Gilchrist and Damien Martyn scoring 31 and 28 runs respectively. Muttiah Muralitharan took three wickets for 26 runs in 9.4 overs. Aravinda de Silva, who was awarded Man of the Match, conceded just 16 runs in 10 overs and took Matthew Hayden's wicket. Sri Lanka, in the reply, reached the target in 40 overs losing only three wickets. Marvan Atapattu scored 51 runs followed by Kumar Sangakkara's 48 and Jayasuriya's 42 runs. Glenn McGrath took two wickets for 41 runs in 10 overs.

Final

The final of the 2002 ICC Champions Trophy was washed out twice, on 29 and 30 September 2002 at the R. Premadasa Stadium, Colombo. The matches were scheduled to play between the Sri Lanka cricket team and the India cricket team, captained by Sanath Jayasuriya and Sourav Ganguly respectively. Both the teams shared the Trophy.

29 September
On 29 September, Sri Lanka batted first after Jayasuriya winning the toss and scored 244 runs. Jayasuriya and Kumar Sangakkara scored fifties—74 and 54 runs respectively, and Indian off-spinner Harbhajan Singh took three wickets for 27 in 10 overs. In reply, India started their batting and scored 14 runs without any loss in two overs before the match was abandoned due to heavy rain; the match was finished in no result. It was decided that the new match would be played on the reserve day.

30 September
On the reserve day—30 September—the Sri Lankans again batted first, scoring 222 runs for seven in 50 overs. Mahela Jayawardene and Russel Arnold scored fifties—77 and 56 runs respectively, and Indian left-arm pacer Zaheer Khan took three wickets for 44 runs in nine overs. India scored 38 runs in 8.4 overs and the match was abandoned due to rain without result.

In both matches, Man of the match and Man of the Series were not awarded. Both the teams, India and Sri Lanka, were declared joint winners sharing the trophy and a prize money of $300,000.
West Indian Steve Bucknor and David Shepherd of England stood umpires of the matches. Daryl Harper  of Australia was the TV umpire and the Zimbabwean Russell Tiffin was the reserve umpire for the matches. Match referee for the finals was former West Indian captain Clive Lloyd.

Aftermath
International Cricket Council's (ICC) rule for One Day International (ODI) cricket at that time was: "a minimum of 25 overs have to be bowled to the side batting second to constitute a match". Indian cricketers criticized the rule ICC Champions Trophy after rain washed-out the final twice. Former Indian wicket-keeper Farokh Engineer about the rule that the "it's absolutely daft", and it "doesn't make any sense". Sanjay Manjrekar, former Test cricketer, said that the ICC "should look at that rule straight away and change it", and the "obvious thing is to continue from where they left off". Ajit Wadekar, former Indian captain, called the matches "boring" and asked the ICC  to revise the group format for the tournament to preclude meaningless matches in the first round.

References

External links

2002
2002 in Sri Lankan cricket
International cricket competitions in 2002
Cricket, ICC Champions Trophy Final, 2002
Final